N'Dama is a breed of cattle.

It is also a given name and surname and may refer to:

Given name
Ndama Bapupa (born 1972), Congolese footballer

Surname
Guy Nzouba-Ndama (born 1946), Gabonese politician, party leader, government minister, President of the National Assembly of Gabon (1997–2016)
Solène Ndama (born 1998), French athlete of Gabonese descent specializing in 100m hurdles, heptathlon and pentathlon

See also
Ndaba
Gabonese surnames

Surnames of the Democratic Republic of the Congo
Surnames of Tanzania